census of India, the following villages are recognized in Guntur district, Andhra Pradesh, India. This list is organized alphabetically by mandal. Settlements not counted in the 2011 census are not included.

A

B

C

D

E

G

I

K

M

N

P

R

S

T

V

See also 
List of villages in Krishna district

Notes

References 

Guntur villages
 
Guntur